Rombout van Troyen (c 1605, Amsterdam – 1655, Amsterdam) was a Dutch Golden Age painter.

Biography
According to Houbraken he painted Italianate landscapes of ruined palaces and grottos, though he had never been to Italy.
According to the RKD his works are confused with those of Jan Pynas.
He painted landscapes and architectural scenes.

References

Rombout van Troyen on Artnet

1605 births
1655 deaths
Dutch Golden Age painters
Dutch male painters
Painters from Amsterdam